The Schuylkill and Juniata Railroad Company was a railroad company formed on 1 June 1900 from the consolidation of five subsidiaries of the Pennsylvania Railroad (PRR).  The predecessor component railroads were the Pennsylvania Schuylkill Valley; Nescopec; North and West Branch; Sunbury, Hazleton and Wilkesbarre; and the Sunbury and Lewistown.  These lines all served the Coal Region  of northeastern Pennsylvania.  The company was absorbed into the PRR in 1902.

References 

Predecessors of the Pennsylvania Railroad
Defunct Pennsylvania railroads
Railway companies established in 1900
Railway companies disestablished in 1902